Leigh Ann Orsi (born May 15, 1981 in California) is a former actress.

She is best known for playing Brad's (Zachery Ty Bryan) second girlfriend, Ashley, on the sitcom Home Improvement.  Also featured as Hannah in the 1994 film, The Favor starring Brad Pitt. She also appeared for one season on the drama Life Goes On, as Zoe, Becca (Kellie Martin) and Corky's (Chris Burke) cousin. Her last acting credit was the 1994 film Pet Shop. Her younger sister Ginger Orsi is also a former actress.

Filmography

References

External links

 Leigh Ann Orsi's channel on YouTube

1981 births
Living people
20th-century American actresses
Actresses from Los Angeles
American child actresses
American female erotic dancers
American erotic dancers
American film actresses
American television actresses
21st-century American women